The 2012–13 Sacramento Kings season was the 68th season of the franchise, and the 64th season in the National Basketball Association (NBA), and its 28th in Sacramento.

Key dates
 June 28: The 2012 NBA draft took place at Prudential Center in Newark, New Jersey.

Draft picks

Roster

Pre-season

|- style="background:#cfc;"
| 1
| October 10
| Phoenix
| 
| DeMarcus Cousins (21)
| DeMarcus Cousins (9)
| Four players (4)
| Power Balance Pavilion9,633
| 1–0
|- style="background:#cfc;"
| 2
| October 15
| Portland
| 
| Marcus Thornton (23)
| DeMarcus Cousins, Chuck Hayes (7)
| Chuck Hayes, Isaiah Thomas (4)
| Power Balance Pavilion9,328
| 2–0
|- style="background:#fcc;"
| 3
| October 17
| Golden State
| 
| Isaiah Thomas (13)
| DeMarcus Cousins (9)
| Three players (2)
| Power Balance Pavilion10,708
| 2–1
|- style="background:#cfc;"
| 4
| October 19
| @ L. A. Lakers
| 
| Marcus Thornton (19)
| DeMarcus Cousins (10)
| Isaiah Thomas (10)
| Thomas & Mack Center17,792
| 3–1
|- style="background:#cfc;"
| 5
| October 21
| @ L. A. Lakers
| 
| Aaron Brooks, DeMarcus Cousins (16)
| Chuck Hayes (7)
| James Johnson (3)
| Staples Center18,997
| 4–1
|- style="background:#fcc;"
| 6
| October 22
| @ Phoenix
| 
| Thomas Robinson (17)
| Thomas Robinson (8)
| Aaron Brooks, Isaiah Thomas (4)
| US Airways Center9,071
| 4–2
|- style="background:#cfc;"
| 6
| October 25
| @ L. A. Lakers
| 
| DeMarcus Cousins, Isaiah Thomas (20)
| DeMarcus Cousins (13)
| Tyreke Evans (5)
| Valley View Casino Center11,200
| 5–2

Regular season

Game log

|- style="background:#fcc;"
| 1 || October 31 || @ Chicago
| 
| Tyreke Evans (21)
| Evans & Thompson (8)
| Evans & Hayes (3)
| United Center21,313
| 0–1

|- style="background:#fcc;"      
| 2 || November 2 || @ Minnesota
| 
| Isaiah Thomas (20)
| Chuck Hayes (11)
| Tyreke Evans (4)
| Target Center19,356
| 0–2
|- style="background:#fcc;"       
| 3 || November 3 || @ Indiana
| 
| Marcus Thornton (26)
| DeMarcus Cousins (13)
| Evans, Thornton and Hayes (4)
| Bankers Life Fieldhouse18,165
| 0–3
|- style="background:#cfc;"       
| 4 || November 5 || Golden State
| 
| DeMarcus Cousins (23)
| DeMarcus Cousins (15)
| Marcus Thornton (3)
| Sleep Train Arena17,317
| 1–3
|- style="background:#cfc;"       
| 5 || November 7 || Detroit
| 
| DeMarcus Cousins (21)
| DeMarcus Cousins (11)
| Aaron Brooks (4)
| Sleep Train Arena10,185
| 2–3
|- style="background:#fcc;"       
| 6 || November 9 || San Antonio
| 
| Thompson and Thornton (17)
| DeMarcus Cousins (9)
| Cousins, Evans, Thornton and Hayes (3)
| Sleep Train Arena13,505
| 2–4
|- style="background:#fcc;"       
| 7 || November 11 || @ L. A. Lakers
| 
| Jimmer Fredette (18)
| Jason Thompson (10)
| Tyreke Evans (4)
| Staples Center18,997
| 2–5
|- style="background:#fcc;"       
| 8 || November 13 || Portland
| 
| James Johnson (16)
| Jason Thompson (11)
| Fredette & Hayes (6)
| Sleep Train Arena10,153
| 2–6
|- style="background:#fcc;"       
| 9 || November 16 || Atlanta
| 
| Jason Thompson (19)
| DeMarcus Cousins (16)
| DeMarcus Cousins (7)
| Sleep Train Arena11,814
| 2–7
|- style="background:#fcc;"       
| 10 || November 18 || Brooklyn
| 
| DeMarcus Cousins (29)
| Jason Thompson (8)
| Isaiah Thomas (4)
| Sleep Train Arena11,965
| 2–8
|- style="background:#cfc;"       
| 11 || November 21 || L. A. Lakers
| 
| Marcus Thornton (23)
| Jason Thompson (10)
| Tyreke Evans (6)
| Sleep Train Arena15,249
| 3–8
|- style="background:#fcc;"       
| 12 || November 23 || @ Utah
| 
| Tyreke Evans (19)
| DeMarcus Cousins (7)
| Tyreke Evans (5)
| EnergySolutions Arena18,000
| 3–9
|- style="background:#cfc;"       
| 13 || November 24 || Utah
| 
| Tyreke Evans (27)
| Cousins & Thompson (9)
| Tyreke Evans (5)
| Sleep Train Arena12,239
| 4–9
|- style="background:#fcc;"      
| 14 || November 27 || Minnesota
| 
| Evans & Cousins (20)
| Tyreke Evans (7)
| Tyreke Evans (6)
| Sleep Train Arena10,741
| 4-10
|- style="background:#fcc;"       
| 15 || November 30 || Indiana
| 
| DeMarcus Cousins (19)
| DeMarcus Cousins (16)
| Salmons, Fredette & Hayes (3)
| Sleep Train Arena12,544
| 4–11

|- style="background:#fcc;"       
| 16 || December 1 || @ L. A. Clippers
| 
| Marcus Thornton (20)
| Jason Thompson (12)
| Salmons, Thompson & Hayes (4)
| Staples Center19,060
| 4-12
|- style="background:#cfc;"       
| 17 || December 5 || Toronto
| 
| DeMarcus Cousins (25)
| DeMarcus Cousins (13)
| John Salmons (7)
| Sleep Train Arena12,476
| 5-12
|- style="background:#cfc;"       
| 18 || December 7 || Orlando
| 
| Cousins & Thomas (17)
| DeMarcus Cousins (14)
| Cousins & Thomas (4)
| Sleep Train Arena16,305
| 6-12
|- style="background:#cfc;"       
| 19 || December 8 || @ Portland
| 
| Salmons & Cousins (19)
| DeMarcus Cousins (12)
| John Salmons (11)
| Rose Garden19,454
| 7-12
|- style="background:#fcc;"
| 20 || December 10 || @ Dallas
| 
| Cousins & García (25)
| Jason Thompson (12)
| John Salmons (7)
| American Airlines Center19,737
| 7-13
|- style="background:#fcc;"
| 21 || December 12 || @ Milwaukee Bucks
| 
| Tyreke Evans (17)
| Jason Thompson (15)
| Aaron Brooks (6)
| BMO Harris Bradley Center11,491
| 7-14
|- style="background:#fcc;"       
| 22 || December 14 || @ Oklahoma City
| 
| Isaiah Thomas (26)
| DeMarcus Cousins (7)
| Jason Thompson (4)
| Chesapeake Energy Arena18,203
| 7-15
|- style="background:#fcc;"
| 23 || December 16 || Denver
| 
| Isaiah Thomas (20)
| DeMarcus Cousins (11)
| Isaiah Thomas (4)
| Sleep Train Arena13,327
| 7-16
|- style="background:#fcc;"       
| 24 || December 17 || @ Phoenix
| 
| Jimmer Fredette (22)
| DeMarcus Cousins (10)
| Brooks, Thomas & Hayes (3)
| US Airways Center13,068
| 7-17
|- style="background:#cfc;"       
| 25 || December 19 || Golden State
| 
| DeMarcus Cousins (24)
| Jason Thompson (15)
| Salmons, Cousins & Brooks (5)
| Sleep Train Arena12,885
| 8-17
|- style="background:#fcc;"       
| 26 || December 21 || @ L. A. Clippers
| 
| Jimmer Fredette (16)
| Jason Thompson (8)
| John Salmons (4)
| Staples Center19,060
| 8-18
|- style="background:#cfc;"       
| 27 || December 23 || Portland
| 
| Marcus Thornton (22)
| John Salmons (7)
| John Salmons (7)
| Sleep Train Arena13,244
| 9-18
|- style="background:#fcc;"       
| 28 || December 26 || @ Portland
| 
| John Salmons (19)
| Chuck Hayes (9)
| Isaiah Thomas (6)
| Rose Garden20,545
| 9-19
|- style="background:#cfc;"       
| 29 || December 28 || New York
| 
| Marcus Thornton (18)
| DeMarcus Cousins (10)
| DeMarcus Cousins (5)
| Sleep Train Arena16,407
| 10-19
|- style="background:#cfc;"       
| 30 || December 30 || Boston
| 
| Isaiah Thomas (27)
| DeMarcus Cousins (10)
| DeMarcus Cousins (10)
| Sleep Train Arena15,305
| 11-19

|- style="background:#fcc;"       
| 31 || January 1 || @ Detroit
| 
| DeMarcus Cousins (21)
| DeMarcus Cousins (14)
| John Salmons (6)
| The Palace of Auburn Hills12,175
| 11-20
|- style="background:#cfc;"       
| 32 || January 2 || @ Cleveland
| 
| Jason Thompson (19)
| DeMarcus Cousins (16)
| DeMarcus Cousins (6)
| Quicken Loans Arena12,331
| 12-20
|- style="background:#cfc;"       
| 33 || January 4 || @ Toronto
| 
| DeMarcus Cousins (31)
| DeMarcus Cousins (20)
| Isaiah Thomas (6)
| Air Canada Centre17,824
| 13-20
|- style="background:#fcc;"       
| 34 || January 5 || @ Brooklyn
| 
| DeMarcus Cousins (28)
| DeMarcus Cousins (11)
| Aaron Brooks (4)
| Barclays Center17,732
| 13-21
|- style="background:#fcc;"       
| 35 || January 7 || Memphis
| 
| John Salmons (17)
| Thomas Robinson (12)
| Isaiah Thomas (4)
| Sleep Train Arena11,531
| 13-22
|- style="background:#fcc;"       
| 36 || January 10 || Dallas
| 
| DeMarcus Cousins (29)
| Thomas Robinson (10)
| Salmons, Cousins & Thomas (4)
| Sleep Train Arena14,011
| 13-23
|- style="background:#fcc;"       
| 37 || January 12 || Miami
| 
| Isaiah Thomas (34)
| Thomas Robinson (10)
| Isaiah Thomas (5)
| Sleep Train Arena14,367
| 13-24
|- style="background:#cfc;"       
| 38 || January 14 || Cleveland
| 
| DeMarcus Cousins (26)
| DeMarcus Cousins (14)
| Cousins & Thomas (6)
| Sleep Train Arena12,194
| 14-24
|- style="background:#cfc;"
| 39 || January 16 || Washington
| 
| Cousins, Evans & Salmons (21)
| DeMarcus Cousins (16)
| Tyreke Evans (8)
| Sleep Train Arena11,611
| 15-24
|- style="background:#fcc;"
| 40 || January 18 || @ Memphis
| 
| DeMarcus Cousins (22)
| DeMarcus Cousins (12)
| Isaiah Thomas (5)
| FedExForum15,910
| 15-25
|- style="background:#cfc;"       
| 41 || January 19 || @ Charlotte
| 
| Marcus Thornton (17)
| DeMarcus Cousins (10)
| Isaiah Thomas (7)
| Time Warner Cable Arena17,012
| 16-25
|- style="background:#fcc;"       
| 42 || January 21 || @ New Orleans
| 
| DeMarcus Cousins (29)
| DeMarcus Cousins (13)
| Evans & Salmons (4)
| New Orleans Arena10,880
| 16-26
|- style="background:#fcc;"       
| 43 || January 23 || Phoenix
| 
| Tyreke Evans (16)
| DeMarcus Cousins (15)
| Isaiah Thomas (7)
| Sleep Train Arena12,741
| 16-27
|- style="background:#fcc;"
| 44 || January 25 || Oklahoma City
| 
| Tyreke Evans (16)
| Cousins & Salmons (8)
| James Johnson (4)
| Sleep Train Arena15,022
| 16-28
|- style="background:#fcc;"
| 45 || January 26 || @ Denver
| 
| Aaron Brooks (16)
| Thomas Robinson (10)
| DeMarcus Cousins (4)
| Pepsi Center17,651
| 16-29
|- style="background:#cfc;"
| 46 || January 28 || @ Washington
| 
| Isaiah Thomas (22)
| Evans, Hayes& Thompson (5)
| Isaiah Thomas (7)
| Verizon Center13,422
| 17-29
|- style="background:#fcc;"       
| 47 || January 30 || @ Boston
| 
| Tyreke Evans (19)
| Tyreke Evans (11)
| DeMarcus Cousins (4)
| TD Garden18,624
| 17-30

|- style="background:#fcc;"
| 48 || February 1 || @ Philadelphia
| 
| Tyreke Evans (29)
| DeMarcus Cousins (12)
| Isaiah Thomas (5)
| Wells Fargo Center17,927
| 17-31
|- style="background:#fcc;"
| 49 || February 2 || @ New York
| 
| DeMarcus Cousins (25)
| DeMarcus Cousins (9)
| Isaiah Thomas (6)
| Madison Square Garden19,033
| 17-32
|- style="background:#fcc;"
| 50 || February 4 || @ Utah
| 
| Jason Thompson (23)
| Jason Thompson (10)
| Evans & Thomas (3)
| EnergySolutions Arena17,742
| 17-33
|- style="background:#cfc;"
| 51 || February 9 || Utah
| 
| Isaiah Thomas (25)
| DeMarcus Cousins (11)
| Cousins & Evans (25)
| Sleep Train Arena16,193
| 18-33
|- style="background:#cfc;"
| 52 || February 10 || Houston
| 
| Salmons & Thomas (23)
| Chuck Hayes (12)
| Salmons & Thomas (6)
| Sleep Train Arena15,526
| 19-33
|- style="background:#fcc;"
| 53 || February 12 || @ Memphis
| 
| DeMarcus Cousins (23)
| Cousins & Evans (7)
| Cousins & Brooks (4)
| FedExForum14,722
| 19-34
|- style="background:#fcc;"
| 54 || February 13 || @ Dallas
| 
| Tyreke Evans (23)
| DeMarcus Cousins (13)
| James Johnson (4)
| American Airlines Center19,892
| 19-35
|- align="center"
|colspan="9" bgcolor="#bbcaff"|All-Star Break
|- style="background:#fcc;"
| 55 || February 19 || San Antonio
| 
| Isaiah Thomas (22)
| Cousins & Thompson (8)
| Cousins & Thomas (4)
| Sleep Train Arena14,940
| 19-36
|- style="background:#fcc;"       
| 56 || February 22 || @ Atlanta
| 
| Isaiah Thomas (30)
| DeMarcus Cousins (13)
| Isaiah Thomas (9)
| Philips Arena15,031
| 19-37
|- style="background:#fcc;"      
| 57 || February 24 || @ New Orleans
| 
| John Salmons (18)
| DeMarcus Cousins (10)
| Isaiah Thomas (5)
| New Orleans Arena12,788
| 19-38
|- style="background:#fcc;"       
| 58 || February 26 || @ Miami
| 
| Marcus Thornton (36)
| DeMarcus Cousins (15)
| Isaiah Thomas (9)
| American Airlines Arena19,734
| 19-39
|- style="background:#cfc;"      
| 59 || February 27 || @ Orlando
| 
| John Salmons (21)
| Marcus Thornton (8)
| Tyreke Evans (7)
| Amway Center16,722
| 20-39

|- style="background:#fcc;"      
| 60 || March 1 || @ San Antonio
| 
| Marcus Thornton (25)
| DeMarcus Cousins (7)
| Marcus Thornton (5)
| AT&T Center18,581
| 20-40
|- style="background:#cfc;"      
| 61 || March 3 || Charlotte
| 
| John Salmons (22)
| Jason Thompson (14)
| Isaiah Thomas (7)
| Sleep Train Arena14,555
| 21-40
|- style="background:#fcc;"      
| 62 || March 5 || Denver
| 
| Marcus Thornton (32)
| DeMarcus Cousins (13)
| Isaiah Thomas (8)
| Sleep Train Arena11,923
| 21-41
|- style="background:#fcc;"      
| 63 || March 6 || @ Golden State
| 
| Jason Thompson (17)
| Jason Thompson (8)
| Tyreke Evans (6)
| Oracle Arena19,596
| 21-42
|- style="background:#cfc;"       
| 64 || March 8 || Phoenix
| 
| Isaiah Thomas (27)
| DeMarcus Cousins (14)
| DeMarcus Cousins (7)
| Sleep Train Arena13,501
| 22-42
|- style="background:#fcc;"      
| 65 || March 10 || Milwaukee
| 
| DeMarcus Cousins (24)
| DeMarcus Cousins (10)
| Isaiah Thomas (9)
| Sleep Train Arena14,761
| 22-43
|- style="background:#cfc;"       
| 66 || March 13 || Chicago
| 
| Tyreke Evans (26)
| Patrick Patterson (9)
| Tyreke Evans (7)
| Sleep Train Arena14,426
| 23-43
|- style="background:#fcc;"       
| 67 || March 17 || @ L. A. Lakers
| 
| Isaiah Thomas (26)
| Thompson & Hayes (7)
| Tyreke Evans (7)
| Staples Center18,997
| 23-44
|- style="background:#cfc;"       
| 68 || March 19 || L. A. Clippers
| 
| Marcus Thornton (25)
| DeMarcus Cousins (11)
| Toney Douglas (7)
| Sleep Train Arena13,563
| 24-44
|- style="background:#cfc;"       
| 69 || March 21 || Minnesota
| 
| Isaiah Thomas (24)
| DeMarcus Cousins (14)
| Isaiah Thomas (6)
| Sleep Train Arena12,176
| 25-44
|- style="background:#fcc;"       
| 70 || March 23 || @ Denver
| 
| DeMarcus Cousins (24)
| DeMarcus Cousins (15)
| Isaiah Thomas (9)
| Pepsi Center19,155
| 25-45
|- style="background:#fcc;"       
| 71 || March 24 || Philadelphia
| 
| Isaiah Thomas (25)
| DeMarcus Cousins (9)
| Tyreke Evans (8)
| Sleep Train Arena14,647
| 25-46
|- style="background:#cfc;"       
| 72 || March 27 || @ Golden State
| 
| Isaiah Thomas (31)
| Patterson & Thompson (9)
| Isaiah Thomas (7)
| Oracle Arena19,596
| 26-46
|- style="background:#cfc;"       
| 73 || March 28 || @ Phoenix
| 
| DeMarcus Cousins (34)
| DeMarcus Cousins (14)
| Isaiah Thomas (8)
| US Airways Center15,086
| 27-46
|- style="background:#fcc;"     
| 74 || March 30 || L. A. Lakers
| 
| Tyreke Evans (21)
| DeMarcus Cousins (11)
| Tyreke Evans (6)
| Sleep Train Arena17,317
| 27-47

|- style="background:#fcc;"      
| 75 || April 3 || Houston
| 
| Tyreke Evans (22)
| Jason Thompson (15)
| John Salmons (5)
| Sleep Train Arena12,377
| 27-48
|- style="background:#fcc;"        
| 76 || April 5 || Dallas
| 
| Isaiah Thomas (29)
| Jason Thompson (16)
| Tyreke Evans (6)
| Sleep Train Arena13,903
| 27-49
|- style="background:#fcc;"        
| 77 || April 7 || Memphis
| 
| DeMarcus Cousins (22)
| Cousins & Hayes (9)
| Isaiah Thomas (8)
| Sleep Train Arena15,205
| 27-50
|- style="background:#cfc;"        
| 78 || April 10 || New Orleans
| 
| John Salmons (22)
| Jason Thompson (8)
| Toney Douglas (6)
| Sleep Train Arena14,275
| 28-50
|- style="background:#fcc;"        
| 79 || April 12 || @ San Antonio
| 
| DeMarcus Cousins (19)
| DeMarcus Cousins (12)
| Toney Douglas (7)
| AT&T Center18,581
| 28-51
|- style="background:#fcc;"        
| 80 || April 14 || @ Houston
| 
| Travis Outlaw (15)
| Cole Aldrich (12)
| Isaiah Thomas (10)
| Toyota Center18,138
| 28-52
|- style="background:#fcc;"        
| 81 || April 15 || @ Oklahoma City
| 
| Isaiah Thomas (16)
| Cole Aldrich (13)
| Salmons, Outlaw, & Thornton (3)
| Chesapeake Energy Arena18,203
| 28-53
|- style="background:#fcc;"        
| 82 || April 17 || L. A. Clippers
| 
| DeMarcus Cousins (36)
| DeMarcus Cousins (22)
| Isaiah Thomas (10)
| Sleep Train Arena17,317
| 28-54

Standings

Transactions

Overview

Trades

Free agents

References

Sacramento Kings seasons
Sacramento Kings
Sacramento
Sacramento